Ronnie Bardah (born August 29, 1982) is a professional poker player who won a World Series of Poker bracelet at the 2012 World Series of Poker and is also notable for holding the record for most consecutive World Series of Poker main event money finishes, with a streak of 5 years in a row from 2010 to 2014.

Background
Bardah's poker training came from playing Limit Hold'em at Foxwoods Resort Casino. One of his early championships was the 132-entrant $500 No Limit Hold'em 2007 Empire State Hold'em Championships at the Turning Stone Resort & Casino in Verona, New York for $21,300.

Some sources say Bardah is from Brockton, Massachusetts, while others say he is from Stoneham, Massachusetts. Bardah himself said that he was born and raised in Brockton. Bardah's parents both immigrated to the United States from Israel, and he is Jewish.

One of his hobbies when he is away from poker is kickboxing. Following his 2010 deep run in the WSOP main event, he endured unexplained medical issues that caused him to rethink his personal health part of his lifestyle. He changed his diet and exercise routines and spent two and a half months in Thailand, where he studied Muay Thai.

World Series of Poker
He earned $182,088 for winning the 302-entrant $2,500 Limit Hold'em Six Handed 2012 World Series of Poker Event 40 at a final table that included runner-up Marco Johnson and Sorel Mizzi. His largest prize was $317,161 for his 24th-place finish in the 7,319-entrant $10,000 No Limit Hold'em Championship 2010 WSOP main event. He made the final table at the $5,000 Limit Hold'em 2013 World Series of Poker Event 37. In 2014, he cashed in the World Series of Poker main event for the fifth year in a row, setting a new record.

World Poker Tour 
Bardah finished in third-place out of 1,573 entrants at the $3,500 Season XVIII World Poker Tour (WPT) Lucky Hearts Poker Open that was held at the Seminole Hard Rock Hotel & Casino in Hollywood, Florida on January 26, 2021. When down to the final three players, Bardah, Ilyas Muradi, and Robel Andemichael agreed to a deal where Bardah collected $566,135 in prize money, although his official payout for third place would be $392,430. This was Bardah's first WPT final table and his fifth money finish on the WPT.

Survivor
Bardah competed on Survivor: Island of the Idols, the 39th season of the CBS series Survivor. He was the first castaway voted out of the game by a 7–2 vote, placing 20th.

Notes

External links
Ronnie Bardah at Hendonmob.com
Ronnie Bardah at Bluff Magazine
Ronnie Bardah at Card Player
Ronnie Bardah at WSOP.com
Ronnie Bardah Interview (audio + transcript)

American poker players
1982 births
World Series of Poker bracelet winners
Living people
Sportspeople from Brockton, Massachusetts
People from Stoneham, Massachusetts
Sportspeople from Middlesex County, Massachusetts
Survivor (American TV series) contestants